The Union of Writers of Russia is a creative union of professional writers in Russia. It is the successor of the Union of RSFSR Writers, which was founded in 1958. The Union of Writers of Russia has 90 branches in the regions of Russia and other countries.

Activities 
The main tasks of the Union are:
 preservation of a single cultural, literary and informational field in the Russian Federation;
 assistance to the preservation and development of the Russian language and literature, as well as languages and literatures of other peoples of the multinational Russian Federation; meeting the needs of the peoples of the world who want to join the Russian language and literature;
 creation of conditions for the realization of the creative abilities of the members of the Union and beginning writers;
 strengthening the creative community of writers of the Russian Federation, as well as other countries of the world;
 development of initiatives for the adoption at the state and regional level of legislative decisions to improve domestic book publishing, translation, remuneration of authors' work, provide them with social and other support;
 organization of actions and events aimed at promoting the achievements of classical and modern Russian literature;
 concern for the preservation of the literary heritage, assistance to young writers;
 exchange of experience between Russian writers and writers from foreign countries.

Chairmen 
The post of chairman of the Union of Writers of Russia has been held by:
 Leonid Sobolev (1958-1970)
 Sergey Mikhalkov (1970-1990)
 Yuri Bondarev (1991-1994)
 Valery Ganichev (1994–2018)
 Nikolai Ivanov (2018)
The secretary of the board of directors is Vasily Nikolaevich Popov.

See also
List of Russian language writers

References

External links
 Union of Writers of Russia

Civic and political organizations based in the Soviet Union
Soviet literature
Russian literature
Soviet Union
Arts organizations established in 1958
1958 establishments in the Soviet Union
Trade unions in the Soviet Union